Emily Bitto is an Australian writer. Her debut novel The Strays won the 2015 Stella Prize for Australian women's writing.

Biography 
Bitto was shortlisted for the Prize for an Unpublished Manuscript for an emerging Victorian Writer at the 2013 Victorian Premier's Literary Awards, for the manuscript of her debut novel, The Strays. The novel was subsequently published by Affirm Press in March 2014.

The Strays is a fictionalisation of the 1930s group of Australian artists known as the Heide Circle. Bitto has said that she "tried to capture (...) the romance and excitement of that circle; the sense of the new that stirred the stale waters of outer Melbourne when a group of artists came together to work and live side by side, to buck the establishment and create their own small utopia within the confines of an old house and a large, thriving garden."

The Age described it as "an eloquent portrayal of the damage caused by self-absorption as well as a moving study of isolation". It was awarded the $50,000 2015 Stella Prize for the best book of fiction or nonfiction by an Australian woman. The Stella Prize judges described The Strays as "like a gemstone: polished and multifaceted, reflecting illuminations back to the reader and holding rich colour in its depths."

The Strays has been published in the UK (Legend Press), U.S. (Twelve Books) and Canada (Penguin). It was a New York Times Book Review editor's pick, and received favourable reviews from NPR and the New Yorker.

Bitto attended the University of Melbourne where she earned a masters in literary studies and a PhD in creative writing. She lives in Melbourne, where she co-owns and runs the Carlton wine-bar Heartattack and Vine, which she opened with her partner and two friends in late 2014.

Award and honours 
 2022 – Colin Roderick Award, Wild Abandon
 2022 – ALS Gold Medal, shortlisted, Wild Abandon
 2016 – International IMPAC Dublin Literary Award, longlisted, The Strays
 2015 – Debut fiction category, Indie Awards, shortlisted, The Strays
 2015 – Stella Prize, winner, The Strays
 2015 – Dobbie Award, shortlisted, The Strays
 2015 – Glenda Adams Award for New Writing, New South Wales Premier's Literary Awards, shortlisted, The Strays
 2013 – Prize for an Unpublished Manuscript by an Emerging Victorian Writer, Victorian Premier's Literary Awards, shortlisted, The Strays

Bibliography 
 The Strays (2014)
Wild Abandon (2021)

References

External links

Living people
Australian women novelists
University of Melbourne alumni
Year of birth missing (living people)
Place of birth missing (living people)